Oksana Gusarova (born 18 June 1970 in Kiyiv, Ukraine) is a Ukrainian dressage rider. Representing Ukraine, she competed at two European Dressage Championships in 2017 and 2019. During the 2019 FEI European Championships she competed as individual for her country.

References

1970 births
Living people
Sportspeople from Kyiv
Ukrainian dressage riders
Ukrainian female equestrians